The American Journal of Archaeology (AJA), the peer-reviewed journal of the Archaeological Institute of America, has been published since 1897 (continuing the American Journal of Archaeology and of the History of the Fine Arts founded by the institute in 1885). The publication was co-founded in 1885 by Princeton University professors Arthur Frothingham and Allan Marquand. Frothingham became the first editor, serving until 1896.

The journal primarily features articles about the art and archaeology of Europe and the Mediterranean world, including the Near East and Egypt, from prehistoric to Late Antique times. It also publishes book reviews, museum exhibition reviews, and necrologies. It is published in January, April, July, and October each year in print and electronic editions.

The journal's current editor-in-chief is Jane B. Carter. The journal's first woman editor-in-chief was Mary Hamilton Swindler.

From 1940 to 1950 the journal published articles by Michael Ventris, Alice Kober and Emmett Bennett, which contributed to the decipherment of the ancient Linear B script.

Notes

External links 
 AJA Archive since 1885
 AJA on JSTOR

Archaeology journals
Quarterly journals
Publications established in 1885
Publications established in 1897
Academic journals published by learned and professional societies of the United States